Reynesocoeloceras is genus of ammonite that lived during the lower Pliensbachian stage of early Jurassic, ammonite zones Ibex—Davoei.

Distribution
Fossils of this genus are found in Europe, North America, South America and north Africa.

Description
Shells of ammonites belonging to this genera had evolute cadicone whorls with depressed section. Venter has been flat. Ribs were usually single. On the ventrolateral tubercules, which could have been small, or even large, there might have been bifurcation of ribs.

References

Ammonitida genera
Dactylioceratidae
Jurassic ammonites